Decimus Haterius Agrippa (c. 13 BCAD 32) was a Roman plebeian tribune, praetor and consul. He was the son of the orator and senator Quintus Haterius and his wife Vipsania.

Career
He became plebeian tribune in AD 15 and vetoed proposals. Agrippa advanced to praetor in 17. Agrippa was ordinary consul in 22 with Gaius Sulpicius Galba as his colleague. Agrippa at one time strongly urged the emperor Tiberius to nominate a limited number of political candidates from each family. He died in 32, a victim of Tiberius' reign of terror. Tacitus describes him as a "somnolent creature".

Personal life
He married Domitia, daughter of Antonia Major and Lucius Domitius Ahenobarbus. Their only child was Quintus Haterius Antoninus (consul in AD 53).

See also
Clutorius Priscus
List of Roman consuls

References

10s BC births
32 deaths
Year of birth uncertain
1st-century Romans
Imperial Roman consuls
Senators of the Roman Empire
Julio-Claudian dynasty
Agrippa, Decimus
Ancient Roman delatores